Onocosmoecus is a genus of northern caddisflies in the family Limnephilidae. There are at least three described species in Onocosmoecus.

Species
These three species belong to the genus Onocosmoecus:
 Onocosmoecus occidentalis Banks, 1943
 Onocosmoecus sequoiae Wiggins & Richardson, 1986
 Onocosmoecus unicolor (Banks, 1897)

References

Further reading

 
 
 

Trichoptera genera
Articles created by Qbugbot
Integripalpia